Joanna is an opéra comique in two acts by the French composer Étienne Méhul. It premiered at the Opéra-Comique, Paris on 23 November 1802. The libretto, by Benoît-Joseph Marsollier, is a revision of the same author's Emma, ou Le soupçon, set by Étienne Fay in 1799. The piece was not a success and only enjoyed eight performances.

Roles
{| class="wikitable"
!Role
!Voice type
!Premiere Cast
|-
|Amélie, under the name Joanna, the wife of Sir Hervey
|soprano
|Julie-Angélique Scio
|-
|Sir Hervey, under the name Charles, jealous, but deeply in love with his wife
|tenor
|Jean-Baptiste-Sauveur Gavaudan
|-
|Springle, a businessman, garrulous and a little self-interested, but with an excellent heart
|basse-taille (bass-baritone)
|Antoine Juillet "père" (father)
|-
|Lord Hervey, governor of Madras under the name the Duke of Duncan
|baritone
|Jean-Pierre Solié
|-
|Sir Édouard, second son of Lord Hervey, hotheaded but honest
|tenor
|Pierre Gaveaux
|-
|Tomi, the son of Joanna and Charles|soprano (travesti role)
|Anne-Marie Simonet
|-
|A black slave belonging to Édouard
|soprano (travesti role)
|Mlle Chevalier
|-
|colspan="3"|Chorus: Followers of the Duke of Duncan; blacks; English soldiers; Indians 
|-
|}

SynopsisScene: Madras in IndiaBy marrying Amélie, the son of Lord Hervey has brought disgrace on his family and is forced to leave the country. Under the assumed name Charles, he works as a carpenter in Madras and Amélie lives with him under the name Joanna. However, Charles becomes jealous of a young army officer Édouard. Believing Édouard is trying to seduce his wife, Charles challenges him to a duel. The governor of Madras hears the news and, charmed by Joanna, decides to intervene. The governor realises that both Charles and Édouard are his sons. Édouard has been only lightly wounded in the duel. The two brothers embrace and the opera ends happily.

References

Sources
Adélaïde de Place Étienne Nicolas Méhul (Bleu Nuit Éditeur, 2005)
Arthur Pougin Méhul: sa vie, son génie, son caractère (Fischbacher, 1889)
General introduction to Méhul's operas in the  introduction to the edition of Stratonice'' by M. Elizabeth C. Bartlet (Pendragon Press, 1997)
Original libretto at Google Books

Operas by Étienne Méhul
1802 operas
Opéras comiques
French-language operas
Operas